Tahyna MacManus (née Tozzi; born 24 April 1986) is an Australian actress, director, writer and producer. Tahyna starred in several television series and film blockbusters including X-Men Origins: Wolverine before moving to roles behind the lens focusing on directing and producing. Tahyna co-founded an all female led production company, Neon Jane Productions alongside producer Kelly Tomasich. In 2020 the duo launched The Australian Womens Film Festival, a short film festival celebrating women in film and honouring those who have made a significant contribution to the industry.

Early life 
MacManus grew up in the Sydney beach-side suburb of Cronulla with her Italian father, Dutch mother and younger sister, model Cheyenne Tozzi. She began modelling at eight years old.

Career
MacManus played Perri Lawe on the ABC drama Blue Water High in 2005. She returned to the series for the second-to-last episode of the second series, which aired in December 2006. Following that, she starred in Beautiful, her first feature film, playing 17-year-old provocateur Suzy.

In 2009, she appeared in X-Men Origins: Wolverine as Emma, a mutant able to turn her skin into diamond.

Tahyna starred in the film Trophy Kids alongside David Gallagher and Ryan Eggold, which won Best Ensemble Cast at the Breckenridge Festival of Film. In the same year Tozzi also starred 
in the psychological thriller Needle, which was directed by John V. Soto.
She does the voice acting and her likeness was used for a character named Daina Le Guin in the 2011 sci-fi horror game, Dead Space 2.

In 2017, she began filming her feature documentary Misunderstandings Of Miscarriage (M.u.M) which aims to shatter the silence and grief surrounding pregnancy loss through interviews with women across the world. The film also includes interviews with obstetricians, gynaecologists, psychologists and endocrinologists whilst simultaneously documenting Tahyna's own traumatic journey through miscarriage. The film features Claire Holt and Deborra-Lee Furness and will be released in 2020.

In 2020, she co-founded The Australian Womens Film Festival alongside Kelly Tomasich.

Filmography

Personal life
On 25 January 2014, Tahyna married dancer Tristan MacManus. On 5 April 2016, she gave birth to a daughter named Echo Isolde. On 14 March 2019, she gave birth to a son named Oisín Lír.
Tahyna gave birth to her third child, a son named Tadhg Nuada on 3 May 2021.

References

External links

 

1986 births
Australian female karateka
Australian people of Dutch descent
Australian people of Italian descent
Australian television actresses
Living people
People from the Sutherland Shire
Actors from Sydney